Piericidin A is an antibiotic agent. It was discovered from Streptomyces mobaraensis. Being an inhibitor of NADH dehydrogenase, it inhibits electron transfer; its structure resembles that of the ubiquinone, therefore it competes with QB for binding sites in NADH dehydrogenase as well as Photosystem II.

References 

4-Pyridones
NADH dehydrogenase inhibitors
Alcohols